Pierre Maria Michel Heijnen (born 5 October 1953 in The Hague) is a Dutch politician and former civil servant. As a member of the Labour Party (Partij van de Arbeid) he was an MP between 1 March 2007 and 1 September 2013. He focused on matters of local government, civil service personnel and finances.

Heijnen studied Dutch language and Dutch literature at Utrecht University. He worked at the Province of South Holland from 1977 to 1998. From 1986 to 2002 he was a member of the municipal council of The Hague and from April 1998 to April 2006 an alderman of the same municipality.

References

External links 

  House of Representatives biography

1953 births
Living people
Aldermen of The Hague
Dutch civil servants
Labour Party (Netherlands) politicians
Municipal councillors of The Hague
Members of the House of Representatives (Netherlands)
Utrecht University alumni
21st-century Dutch politicians